All the Sins of the Earth is a 1958 West German drama film directed by Fritz Umgelter and starring Barbara Rütting, Ivan Desny and Paul Dahlke.

Cast

References

Bibliography

External links 
 

1958 films
West German films
German drama films
1958 drama films
1950s German-language films
Films directed by Fritz Umgelter
1950s German films